Hugh Gallacher may refer to:

 Hughie Gallacher (1903–1957), Scottish footballer 
 Hugh Gallacher (footballer, born 1870) (1870–1941), Scottish footballer
 Hugh Gallacher (footballer, born 1892) (died 1920), Scottish football left half
 Hugh Gallacher (footballer, born 1930) (1930–2013), Scottish footballer